Seebohm may refer to:

Emily Seebohm (born 1992), an Australian swimmer
Frederic Seebohm, Baron Seebohm (1909 – 1990), a British banker, soldier and social work innovator
Frederic Seebohm (historian) (1833 – 1912), a British economic historian
Hans-Christoph Seebohm (1903 – 1967), a German politician
Henry Seebohm (1832 - 1895), an English steel manufacturer, amateur ornithologist and traveller
John Seebohm (born 1960) a former Australian rules footballer 
Seebohm Rowntree (1871–1954), a British sociological researcher
Thomas Seebohm (1934–2014), a phenomenological philosopher